OM2 may refer to:

Olympus OM-2 camera
Multi-mode optical fiber type OM2